Kjell Rosén (24 April 1921 – 13 June 1999) was a Swedish footballer who played the majority of his career at Malmö FF as a defender. He also played professionally in Italy and in France. After his career as a player Rosén became a coach and coached lower league teams until he returned to Malmö FF as a youth coach.

He won a gold medal in 1948 Summer Olympic Games.

References

External links

1921 births
1999 deaths
Association football defenders
Swedish footballers
Sweden international footballers
Allsvenskan players
Malmö FF players
FC Rosengård 1917 players
Footballers at the 1948 Summer Olympics
Olympic gold medalists for Sweden
Footballers from Malmö